is a 3D fighting video game developed by Sega AM3 on the Sega Model 2 mainboard. It was released in Japanese game centers in 1996. Home versions of Last Bronx were produced for the contemporary Sega Saturn and Windows systems. In Japan, Last Bronx was novelized and serialized into comics and radio drama. A VHS video documenting the motion capture process used for the game and introducing the characters was released in 1996. A year later, Takashi Shimizu directed the live-action movie (V-Cinema). On June 29, 2006, Sega released Last Bronx on PlayStation 2 as a tenth anniversary celebration.

Plot
Last Bronx is set in an alternate version of post-Japanese bubble Tokyo, where youth disenchantment and disillusion with Japan's explosive economic and societal progression lead into the culmination of the historic violent underground event known as the All Tokyo Street Wars, and into an era where crime and gang warfare is rampant.

Upon the peak of the All Tokyo Street Wars, a bōsōzoku gang known as Soul Crew made an explosive rise to power, uniting Tokyo's youth and gangs by their philosophy of Free Soul and enforcing their will by both negotiations and unstoppable and unmatched fighting prowess. This would lead into a brief lived ceasefire however, as soon shortly after, the leader of Soul Crew would be grisly murdered, leading into the Second All Tokyo Street Wars upon his death. Immediately, a message was made by a mysterious group known as Redrum, who demanded a tournament of fair dueling be engaged by the leaders of all of Tokyo's strongest gangs to know who would rule over all of Tokyo's streets. Dismissed by all who read it at first, this treatise would soon be exemplified by the discovery of missing gang members found dead in Tokyo Bay. Now with the Tokyo's street gang underworld's attention, the Second All Tokyo Street War Tournament, or The Last Bronx, would be able to begin.

The game has the following main characters:

Yusaku Kudo is the boss of the bosozoku street gang "Neo-Soul" from Haneda airport. Once the number three man of Soul Crew, Yusaku takes it upon his leader's death to finish what Soul Crew started. His preferred weapon is a metal sansetsukon; his in-game alternate weapon was a Shinkansen scale model.
Joe Inagaki is the boss of the western "chopper" styled bosozoku "Shinjuku Mad" gang from Shinjuku. Once the number two man of Soul Crew, Joe left the gang shortly after, seeking his own independence and leaving Soul Crew's leadership to Yusaku, and engages in The Last Bronx as a test of his skills and thrills. His preferred weapons are metal nunchaku; his in-game alternate weapons are corn ears. Though nunchaku and images of nunchaku were banned in the United Kingdom at the time, Sega convinced the British Board of Film Classification to allow Joe's nunchaku to appear uncensored in the PAL release of the Saturn version.
Saburo Zaimoku is the boss of the "Katsushika Dumpsters" gang from Katsushika. Once a member of Soul Crew, Zaimoku left upon the death of their leader, and reformed himself by working at his family's construction business. When Redrum threatens his workers in attempts to blackmail him to the  Last Bronx, Zaimoku starts up the Katsushika Dumpsters for his co-worker's self defense and sets off to the tournament on his own. Zaimoku's preferred weapon is the hammer; his in-game alternate weapon is a frozen tuna.
Toru Kurosawa is the boss of the "Roppongi Hard Core Boys" gang from Roppongi. One of Soul Crew's more unrepentant and ruthless enemies, the yankii playboy tough finds the Last Bronx the best chance to wipe out his rivals as the true rule of Tokyo's streets and the gang underworld. Kurosawa's preferred weapon is the bokuto (a wooden sword); his in-game alternate weapon is a folding fan.
Nagi Hojo is the boss of the women-only "Dogma" gang from the Rainbow Bridge area of Tokyo, as well as a sadist. Nagi's preferred weapon is the sai; her in-game alternate weapon is a spoon and fork.
Yoko Kono is the boss of the "G-Troops" gang from the Tokyo subways. Originally an airsoft survival game group, the G-Troops then expanded into military martial arts training upon the bubble crash, but their renown eventually got them also caught up in the All Tokyo Street Wars. Yoko engages in the Last Bronx to end all of that, as well to find her missing brother, who was last seen dealing with Redrum. Yoko's preferred weapon is a pair of tonfa; her in-game alternate weapons are umbrellas.
Ken Kono was the co-founder and former boss of the "G-Troop" gang. After refusing the Redrum challenge, Redrum badly injured him in a fire, and his anger made him mad and evil. Eventually, he was turned into Red Eye and himself became an agent for the mysterious Redrum ("Murder" backward) organization. In Yoko's ending, he is beaten by his sister Yoko at the tournament's final in the subway. Ken apologizes and tells his sister the truth, and then dies in her arms. Red Eye's preferred weapon is a metal tonfa; his in-game alternate weapons are chopsticks and broiled sauries.
Hiroshi "Tommy" Tomiie is the boss of the "Helter Skelter" skateboarder gang from Shibuya. Originally from Osaka, Tommy created Helter Skelter to make space in Tokyo and keep unruly gangs from getting in the way of his and his group's boarding. When Redrum declares the Last Bronx to be official, Tommy also engages for many reasons; for thrills, to end the unruly street gang wars, and to impress his crush, Lisa Kusanami. Tommy's preferred weapon is the Bō (a long pole); his in-game alternate weapon is a deck brush. Tommy's stage, "Cross Street", features a Sonic mascot which is Sega Shibuya Game Center's logo.
Lisa Kusanami is the Japanese-American leader of the "Orchids" music-band (and gang) from the moonlight garden in Takeshiba Passenger Ship Terminal. The daughter of a woman who was supposed to have been the next successor to the Kusanami school of martial arts from her grandfather, her mother left with her surrogate father, an American lawyer, for a wealthy life in the United States. Originally founding the Orchids to creatively escape her somewhat troubled home life, the Orchids would soon face them and their fans fighting off the denizens of Japan's street gang underworld upon their extortion, and this would soon lead into Redrum also including the Orchids into the Last Bronx, making for a fight that Lisa never intended. Lisa's preferred weapon is a double metal stick (aka "Double-sticks"); her in-game alternate weapon is a ladle and spatula.

Gameplay
Each match is a best out of two rounds fight with victory by knock out or remaining health at the end of the 30-second time limit. The stages are set in real Tokyo city closed areas without any ring outs. However, fighters can jump on the barriers (and eventually make a disqualifying ring out backflip from there).

Sega AM3 used the "PKG" 3-button system introduced by the AM2 in Virtua Fighter – "P" stands for "Punch" (or weapon), "K" for "Kick" and "G" for "Guard". The player uses the arcade joystick to move the character. Certain joystick and button combinations result in special attacks and combination attacks. The "G" button is used to block the opponent's attacks and to perform a feint attack called "Attack Cancel". Strong attacks, throws and rolling moves can be performed using different button combinations. Taunts can also be used – Last Bronx is part of the rare games in which the CPU uses this feature against the player or even another CPU controlled character.

Development
The arcade version was developed in Japan by the AM3 team that had developed Virtual On. According to director/project lead Akinobu Abe, "The game was designed to be quite realistic, with realistic style and people - Last Bronx characters wear clothes based on current Tokyo street fashions." While working on the game, the developers found that the weapons couldn't be seen during attacks because of how fast they were moving; this led to them programming the weapons to leave afterimages when in motion.

Environmental texture mapping, used to create the reflective effect of the "Metal" versions of the characters, is not a supported feature of the Model 2 hardware and had to be accomplished through programming trickery.

AM3 had a demo of the game ready in time for the AOU show in February 1996, but Sega would not allow them to show it because Sega AM2 was demonstrating several fighting games at the show and they feared another one would divide media and industry attention too much.

The Saturn version was developed by the same team which created the arcade original. They started work on the conversion on November 8, 1996, and first demonstrated it at the April 1997 Tokyo Game Show. Since they believed the fast weapons movement to be the key element to the game's appeal, they prioritized retaining all the animation data and the 60 frames per second frame rate of the arcade version.

None of the development team had ever worked on a Saturn game before. According to Abe, who was also director of the port, the most difficult part was making the collision detection accurate, due to the greater amount of calculations attached to weapons than hand-to-hand combat. They found it impossible to recreate the environmental texture mapping on the "Metal" characters with the Saturn hardware.

Releases
Last Bronx was first planned to be released in the first week of August 1997, but it was actually first sold in Japan on July 25, 1997. The Tokyo Bangaichi subtitle appears only in the Japanese release. The logo's blood squirt was removed in overseas editions. Only the 2006 PlayStation 2 Sega Ages 2500 Series Vol.24 version uses the original Last Bronx: Tokyo Bangaichi title name and logo.

A movie (Toei Video) was dedicated to Last Bronx, with its own OST CD. Last Bronx was launched in summer 1997 with a blockbuster campaign. The Sega Saturn game box contains exclusive extras such as a "Special Disc" featuring two training modes, a vocal characters profile and an "Interactive Tutorial Mode" with extensive vocals. This bonus disc was never released overseas. This package also includes a 56-page illustrated color booklet, a dual-side collector poster featuring character art and a gameplay command list and a set of stickers. The Sega Saturn version is supplemented by extra game modes such as Survival, Time Attack and Saturn Mode. Three Club Remixes by Yoshiaki Ouchi were taken from the movie's OST and added in the game as unlockable BGM for the stages of Tommy, Lisa and Kurosawa.

The "Saturn Mode", or "PC Mode" in the PC version, is a new story mode. The final fight between Yoko and her elder brother Red Eye is no longer the game's climax. The new plot was re-imagined as a complex network revolving around the Soul Crew duel of Yusaku versus Joe, around which all primary and secondary characters are linked to, for individual reasons. As a result, there is no more fixed fighting order with Red Eye as the last boss to beat. Instead the mode features a random route with Red Eye as a sub boss and a final match specific to each character.

Each final match is introduced by a real time cutscene with the two opponents, which differs from the Arcade Mode's unique dialogue between Yoko and Red Eye. The Arcade Mode's "Extra Stage", which is only available when beating Red Eye without using a continue, does not exist in the story mode. In this bonus stage, the ultimate opponent is a Dural-like metallic mute version of the player's own character. Depending on the version, this extra character is either a solid gray color or reflective. In the console versions, Red Eye is playable with his own story mode ending movie.

Winning the story mode's final stage unlocks a different ending anime sequence for each character, and each video is available for future viewing in the "Movie" mode. Prolific Japanese studio Telecom Animation Film (テレコム•アニメーション•フィルム) produced all ten videos, including the opening music sequence.

Last Bronx includes advertising for real life brands such as Shott, Suzuki, Toyo Tires, AM Records, Java Tea, Axia, Wild Blue Yokohama (theme park) and JAL. Most of these advertising bills were removed or exchanged with Sega or Saturn logos, sometimes replaced by "Now Printing" bills, in the oversea releases. An "AAA Act Against AIDS" bill, which is a Japanese nonprofit annual event concert, was introduced in the subway stage of the 1998 Windows version.

After the worldwide release of Last Bronx, Sega PC started a port of the Sega Saturn version for Windows 95/98. This February 1998 home version is basically the same as its predecessor but graphically closer to the arcade original with much more detailed fighting environments. The game also ran at a faster frame when using the new "Auto Control" option. The CPU versus CPU non-playable "Watch Mode" was removed. A new "Replay" feature was introduced and extra modes were added including "Team Battle" and "Network Battle", both playable in single, 2-player or 10-player LAN/Internet. Screen resolutions and graphic detail options were also available.

Ten years after the original release, Sega released Last Bronx on the PlayStation 2. This version is a straight emulation of the arcade original, with none of the special modes added to the ports. The four game modes are "Arcade Mode", "VS Mode", "Survival Mode" and "Time Attack Mode". The "Replay Mode" which was introduced in the Windows version is still available and now gives the player the ability to save into the memory card their own "Replays" in order to watch them later. In this upgraded mode, the user can now zoom in/out and freely select the camera angle or even rotate over 360° around the moving characters. This version also features the Sega Ages 2500 usual "Archives" mode with some game art. A hidden bonus menu featuring exclusive options is included in the PlayStation 2 version:

Kaodeka Mode: The "Huge Face Mode" allows the use of characters with oversized head, which is typical of the SD anime/manga style.
Bukideka Mode: The "Huge Weapon Mode" allows the use of oversized weapons for both characters. These cartoon style big arms don't affect the power of the fighters though.
Invincible Mode: This mode disables damage for both characters allowing an unlimited health bar. As a consequence, the player cannot reach the second stage in the single player modes nor cheat in "Survival Mode". This feature is actually meant to be combined with the "Round Time" option set to "Infinity" to be used as a "Practice Mode".
Tough Mode: This mode doubles the strength for both characters. When hit, a fighter will only lose the half of the damage compared to the default setting.
Homerun Mode: When struck by an uppercut or a powerful attack, the fighters will float much higher in the sky. This mode's name is a reference to the baseball explicit term home run.
Gourad Use: Turning on this mode will allow the user to unlock both "Metal" (3DCG model textured with Gouraud shaded reflection & light source effects) and "Gray" (the same light sourced, gray colored 3DCG model minus the reflection effect) versions for all playable characters. An unplayable "Metal" version was already available in the Arcade version, and was also selectable in the PC version through the "Character Model" option. Due to the amount of CPU resource required by the "Metal" effect's Gouraud shading real time operation, a low-detail stage, including simple light sources, was specially designed to host this character: the "Brilliant Room". On the Sega Saturn version, the "Metal" effect is untextured and gray instead. The latter was kept and made available for low-end computers in the following Windows edition. Since the PlayStation 2 hardware is superior to the Model 2, the "Metal" version is now available in all stages, for the two fighters and is even selectable in the character selection screen just like a regular, alternate, costume.

The game is fully compatible with the SegaSaturn Control Pad/Virtua Stick for PlayStation 2 which was specially released on the Japanese market to fit the Sega Ages vintage line. Like its predecessors, this new version doesn't support the vibration function. However, it does feature extensive display options – including frame rate adjustment and letterbox mode. A cheat code can be used to switch between the "Last Bronx 1996" and "Last Bronx 2006". The first one uses the original title screen, game graphics and secret tip messages (how to unlock the Survival Mode, etc.). The latter includes game modes selection, options and the "Pause" function.

Two campaign editions were released through the Sega Direct online shop. The first one was a regular edition bundled with an exclusive "葱 Dumpsters" round badge. The second edition is named "DX Pack", for "Deluxe Pack", and features a "portable strap set" and a "postcard set".

Reception

Last Bronx was already a hit and popular franchise in Japan before the home version's release, but it flopped in U.S. arcades, appearing in only a handful of venues in the country.

Next Generation reviewed the arcade version, describing it as "a grittier, and in some ways more inventive product than the sometimes overly smooth efforts of AM2." The reviewer also praised the subtle techniques, use of the same intuitive three-button configuration used on all Model 2 fighting games, challenging opponent A.I., fluid animation, and intense sound effects.

Assessments of the Saturn port's technical qualities were moderately positive, with praise for the smooth frame rate, high resolution, and motion trails left by weapons, but criticism for the glitching out of polygons. Sega Saturn Magazine said that the port has "some jaw-dropping visuals virtually indistinguishable from the coin-op original" while Next Generation attributed the compromises the port made as a sign that "developers are approaching the asymptotic side of [the] Saturn's graphics curve".

The design and gameplay received a broader range of opinions from reviewers. GameSpot, which gave Last Bronx a negative review, said its biggest problem is that it fails to differentiate itself from Sega's previous fighting games. However, most reviewers said that the brutal gang style of the fighters were enough to set it apart from its predecessors. Next Generation, for instance, commented that "Weapons-based combat with VF response transform matches from stately martial arts trials to short, nasty, and brutish struggles for survival. And, truthfully, it's kind of refreshing to be nasty and brutish." Both GamePro and Dan Hsu of Electronic Gaming Monthly criticized that the cheap techniques, including the ability to take out half a character's health with a single combo, make the matches excessively short and mindless. Hsu's co-reviewer Shawn Smith instead praised the fact that no skill is required to do well in the game, even when playing against fighting game masters. Another common criticism was that there are too few characters. Most reviewers concluded that Last Bronx is clearly inferior to the earlier Saturn fighting game Fighters Megamix, though Smith said Last Bronx was "easily my favorite Saturn fighter."

Next Generation reviewed the PC version of the game, stating that "It's too bad Sega dropped the ball because this coulda' been a contender."

Merchandise

Books
A manga series was launched in the Asuka Fantasy DX collection and Last Bronx was also novelized by Asuka Books.
Artbooks
1997.04: Last Bronx Official Art Works (SoftBank Creative, SoftBank Books, 111p.)

Comics
In May 2005, the Chinese publisher Ching Win has licensed the Asuka Comics DX manga which were created by the game director himself, for an official release in Taiwan.
1997.09: Last Bronx 4Koma Gag Battle Hinotama Game Comic Series (Shounen On Comics, Koubunsha, 132p.)
1997.10: Last Bronx Comic Anthology (G-Collection, Broccoli, Movic, 165p.)
1998.05: Last Bronx #1 (illus:Saitou Remi/story:Akinobu Abe, Asuka Comics DX, Kadokawa, 176p.)
1998.08: Last Bronx #2 (illus:Saitou Remi/story:Akinobu Abe, Asuka Comics DX, Kadokawa, 169p.)
199X.XX: Last Bronx Complete Edition Set (illus:Saitou Remi/story:Akinobu Abe, Shonen Comic, Kadokawa, 345p.)
2005.05: Last Bronx ~Tokyo Bangaichi~ Martial Arts Tournament Arena Complete Edition
(illus:Saitou Remi/story:Akinobu Abe, Ching Win Publishing Group, licensed by Kadokawa, 345p.)

Novels
1997.07: Last Bronx (Asuka Books)

Strategy guides
1996.08: Last Bronx ~Tokyo Bangaichi~ Official Command Book (Aspect, Ascii 62p.)
1996.10: Last Bronx ~Tokyo Bangaichi~ Official Guide Book (Aspect, Ascii, 269p.)
1996.11: Last Bronx ~Tokyo Bangaichi~ Arcade Game Hisshou Special (Keibunsha)
1997.09: Last Bronx Complete File For Expert (Mainichi Communications, 125p.)
1997.09: Last Bronx Official Guide (Soft Bank Creative, 175p.)
1997.09: Last Bronx V-Jump Books Game Series (Shueisha, 130p.)

Toys
In the brand's game centers, Sega used to offer Tokyo Bangaichi related prizes to pachinko gamers and local arcade contest winners. Various goodies such as plush toys and female fighters dedicated super deformed plastic key holders were produced in Japan by the time of the game's arcade release. An all-character plush toy Christmas special edition was even created in December 1996. When the Sega Saturn was released the following year, the famous model kit maker Hogaraka bought the license to sale official Last Bronx dolls of Lisa, Nagi and Yoko.

Film

Documentary
1996.08: Last Bronx ~Tokyo Bangaichi~ Compilation (VHS, Columbia Music Entertainment, 45mn, COVC-4728)

V-cinema
1996.10: Last Bronx ~Tokyo Bangaichi~ (VHS, General Entertainment)
1997.06: Last Bronx ~Tokyo Bangaichi~ (VHS, director:Kazuya Shimizu/music:Yoshiaki Ouchi, Toei Video, 90mn, VRZF-00368)

Audio
The Saturn exclusive opening anime's theme song Jaggy Love, performed by the R&B trio D'Secrets (Kaori, Mayumi & Rie) was released as a single, with Kaze No Street as the B-side.
Game OST
1997.06: Last Bronx ~Tokyo Bangaichi~ Sound Battle (Tokoyuki Kawamura, Fast Smile Entertainment, 49mn, FSCA-10008)
1997.08: Jaggy Love [MAXI-CD] (D'Secrets, lyrics:Minoru Ohta/music:Woora, Inoks Record, Pony Canyon, PCDA-95016)

Radio drama
Pony Canyon published a four episodes Radio drama audio CD series.
1997.09: Last Bronx Radio Drama Vol.1 (Inoks Record, Pony Canyon, PCCG-95002)
1997.10: Last Bronx Radio Drama Vol.2 (Inoks Record, Pony Canyon, PCCG-95003)
1997.11: Last Bronx Radio Drama Vol.3 (Inoks Record, Pony Canyon, PCCG-95004)
1997.12: Last Bronx Radio Drama Vol.4 (Inoks Record, Pony Canyon, PCCG-95005)

V-cinema OST
1997.06: Last Bronx ~Soundtrack VS Club Remix~ (Yoshiaki Ouchi, Inoks Record, Pony Canyon, PCCG-95001)

References

External links
 Tokyo Bangaichi -PS2 version- official web site
 Telecom Animation Film -Last Bronx animation- official web site
 PS2 Last Bronx secret (official section)

1996 video games
3D fighting games
Arcade video games
Fighting games
Multiplayer and single-player video games
Organized crime video games
PlayStation 2 games
Sega arcade games
Sega Saturn games
Sega video games
Sega-AM3 games
Video games developed in Japan
Video games set in Tokyo
Windows games